James Crabb (1830–1891) was Dean  of Brechin from 1889 until  his death on 24 August 1891.

Crabb was educated at the University of St Andrews and ordained in 1854.  He was curate in charge at Lanark then held incumbencies at Pittenweem and Brechin. He was also Chaplain to the Provincial Grand Lodge of Forfarshire.

Notes

Scottish Episcopalian clergy
Alumni of the University of St Andrews
Deans of Brechin
1891 deaths
1830 births